Claudio Costanzo (born 3 July 1985 in Frattamaggiore) is an Italian footballer. He plays as a midfielder. He is currently playing for A.C. Isola Liri.

External links
 Career profile by tuttocalciatori.net

1985 births
Living people
Sportspeople from the Province of Naples
Italian footballers
Serie B players
Ascoli Calcio 1898 F.C. players
S.S. Chieti Calcio players
U.S. Viterbese 1908 players

Association football midfielders
Footballers from Campania